This is the discography of Brazilian Axé/MPB singer-songwriter Daniela Mercury. From 1988 to 1990, Mercury released two albums with the group Companhia Clic. In 1991, she started a solo career with the release of a self-titled album.

Mercury is one of the best-selling female Latin American artists of all time. She sold more than 20 million albums worldwide (over 12 million in Brazil alone).

Albums

Companhia Clic (1988–1990)
 Companhia Clic - Vol. 1 (1988)
 Companhia Clic - Vol. 2 (1989)

Solo career (1990–present)

Studio albums

Live albums

Compilations albums

DVDs

Other songs

Guest appearances

Videography

References

External links
 Discography of Daniela Mercury at her official website
 Discography of Daniela Mercury at her official website

Discographies of Brazilian artists
Latin pop music discographies